Doris Margaret Kenyon (September 5, 1897 – September 1, 1979) was an American actress of motion pictures and television.

Early life
She grew up in Syracuse, New York, where her family had a home at 1805 Harrison Street. Her father, Dr. James B. Kenyon, was a Methodist Episcopal Church minister at University Church. Kenyon studied at Packer College Institute and later at Columbia University. She sang in the choirs of Grace Presbyterian and Bushwick Methodist Churches in Brooklyn, New York. Her brother was dentist and New York assemblyman Raymond T. Kenyon.

Her voice attracted the attention of Broadway theatrical scouts who enticed her to become a performer on the stage. In 1915, she first appeared as a chorus girl in the Victor Herbert operetta The Princess Pat.

Film career

In 1915, she made her first film, The Rack, with World Film Company of Fort Lee, New Jersey. One of the most remembered films of her early career is Monsieur Beaucaire (1924). In this production, she starred opposite Rudolph Valentino. She and her husband, Milton Sills, starred in The Unguarded Hour for First National Pictures (1925). Laura Wood, a star swimmer and wife of Gaylord Wood, First National Pictures cinematographer, doubled for her swimming scenes because she couldn't swim.

Kenyon's first sound film was The Home Towners (1928). She also starred in Paramount Pictures' first talking film, Interference (1928).

Kenyon was cast opposite actor George Arliss in two films: Alexander Hamilton (1931) and Voltaire (1933). She participated in Counsellor at Law (1933) with John Barrymore. In the autumn of 1935, Doris appeared with Ramon Novarro in the play A Royal Miscarriage in London.

Kenyon's film career ended with a cameo in The Man in the Iron Mask (1939).

Music
Kenyon's performances as a singer grew out of an evening in New York when a manager of concert artists heard her sing at home for some friends. Afterward, he worked with her to arrange a tour. Singing eventually became an outlet for expressing her feelings after her first husband's death. A soprano, she performed in Detroit as part of the Town Hall Series and in Phoenix as part of the All-Star Artists Series, among others.

Kenyon's concerts featured more than vocal performances. Her "Lyrical Silhouettes" tour in 1933 included "characterizations presented in a half-dozen or more foreign languages and dialects." A variety of costumes supplemented the music in the program's segments.

Radio
Kenyon played Ann Cooper in the soap opera Crossroads on NBC in the 1940s.

Television
Kenyon continued her acting career in television in the 1950s. She was cast in episodes of The Secret Storm (1954), Schlitz Playhouse of Stars and 77 Sunset Strip.

Marriages
Kenyon was married four times. 
 Her first husband was the actor Milton Sills. She wed Sills on October 12, 1926. She was widowed in 1930. She had one son with Sills, Kenyon Clarence Sills, born in 1927. 
 She married New York real estate broker Arthur Hopkins in 1933. The two divorced the following year, citing incompatibility. 
 In 1938 Doris married Albert D. Lasker, owner of Lord & Thomas, an advertising agency. They divorced in 1939. 
 Her final marriage was to musician Bronislaw Mlynarski in 1947. He was the son of composer Emil Młynarski and the brother-in-law of Arthur Rubinstein.

Death
Doris Kenyon died on September 1, 1979, at her home in Beverly Hills, California of cardiac arrest.

In popular culture
In 1922, a newborn girl, Doris Kappelhoff, was named after Kenyon. Kappelhoff grew up to be singer and actress Doris Day. Many years later, Day purchased a home in Beverly Hills that was "a few houses away from [Kenyon's], on the very same street."

Filmography
Silent

The Rack (1915) as Effie McKenzie
The Pawn of Fate (1916) as Marcine Dufrene
The Feast of Life (1916) as Celida
The Man Who Stood Still (1916) as Marie Krauss
The Ocean Waif (1916, Short) as Millie Jessop (Extant)
The Traveling Salesman (1916) as Beth Elliot
The Man Who Forgot (1917) as Edith Mallon
A Girl's Folly (1917) as Mary Baker (Extant)
 The Empress (1917) as Nedra
Jimmy Dale Alias the Grey Seal (1917, Short) (Lost) (uncredited)
On Trial (1917) (uncredited)
The Great White Trail (1917) as Prudence Carrington
Strictly Business (1917, Short)
The Hidden Hand (1917, Serial) as Doris Whitney (Lost)
The Street of Seven Stars (1918) as Harmony Wells
The Inn of the Blue Moon (1918) as Justine Druce / Dorothy Druce
Wild Honey (1918, William L. Sherry / Film Clearing House) as Wild Honey / Mrs. Holbrook
Twilight (1919, William L. Sherry / Film Clearing House) as Twilight
The Bandbox (1919, W.W. Hodkinson / Pathe Exchange) as Eleanor Searle
The Harvest Moon (1920, W.W. Hodkinson / Pathe Exchange) as Dora Fullerton
The Conquest of Canaan (1921) (Extant) as Ariel Taber
Get-Rich-Quick Wallingford (1921) as Fannie Jasper
Shadows of the Sea (1922, Selznick Pictures) as Dorothy Jordan
The Ruling Passion (1922, United Artists) as Angie Alden
Sure Fire Flint (1922, Mastodon Films) as June De Lanni
You Are Guilty (1923, Mastodon Films) as Alice Farrell
 The Last Moment (1923, Goldwyn Pictures) as Alice Winthrop
Bright Lights of Broadway (1923, Principal Distributing) as Irene Marley
Restless Wives (1924, CC Burr) as Amy Van Clayton
The Love Bandit (1924, Vitagraph) as Polly Benson
The New School Teacher (1924) as Diana Pope
Lend Me Your Husband (1924, CC Burr) as Aline Stackton
Monsieur Beaucaire (1924) as Lady Mary (Extant)
Born Rich (1924, First National) as Frances Melrose
Idle Tongues (1924, Ince / First National) as Katherine Minot
If I Marry Again (1925, First National) as Jocelyn Margot
A Thief in Paradise (1925, First National) as Helen Saville (Lost)
I Want My Man (1925, First National) as Vida (Trailer only; Library of Congress)
The Half-Way Girl (1925, First National) as Poppy La Rue (Lost)
The Unguarded Hour (1925, First National) as Virginia Gilbert (Lost)
Men of Steel (1926, First National) as Mary Berwick (Lost)
Mismates (1926, First National) as Judy Winslow (Lost)
Ladies at Play (1926, First National) as Ann Harper (Lost)
The Blonde Saint (1926) as Ghirlaine Bellamy (Lost)
The Valley of the Giants (1927) as Shirley Pennington (Extant; UCLA Film & TV)
Burning Daylight (1928, First National) as Virgie (Extant; Library of Congress)
The Hawk's Nest (1928) as Madelon Arden (Lost)

Sound

The Home Towners (1928, Warner Brothers) as Beth Calhoun (Lost)
Interference (1928) as Faith Marlay
Beau Bandit (1930, RKO) as Helen Wardell
The Bargain (1931, First National / Warner Bros.) as Nancy
Alexander Hamilton (1931) as Betsy Hamilton
The Road to Singapore (1931) as Philippa Crosby March
The Ruling Voice (1931, First National / Warner Bros.) as Mary Stanton
Young America (1932) as Edith Doray
The Man Called Back (1932) as Diana St. Claire
Voltaire (1933) as Mme. Pompadour
No Marriage Ties (1933, RKO) as Adrienne Deane
Counsellor at Law (1933) as Cora Simon
Whom the Gods Destroy (1934, Columbia) as Margaret Forrester
The Human Side (1934, Universal) as Vera Sheldon
Along Came Love (1936, Paramount) as Mrs. Gould
Girls' School (1938) as Mrs. Simpson
The Man in the Iron Mask (1939, United Artists) as Queen Anne

References
Notes

Bibliography

External links

 
 
 
 Doris Kenyon at Virtual History

Methodists from New York (state)
20th-century American actresses
American film actresses
American television actresses
American silent film actresses
Vaudeville performers
Actresses from Syracuse, New York
1897 births
1979 deaths
Columbia University alumni
20th-century American singers
20th-century American women singers